The Northwest Asian Weekly is an Asian American newspaper based in Seattle, Washington's International District. It was founded in 1983 by Assunta Ng, publisher of the Seattle Chinese Post, and published free weekly editions until January 2023.

History

Northwest Asian Weekly published its first edition on February 5, 1983, as the successor to an English insert in the Seattle Chinese Post that debuted in September 1982. Both newspapers were published by Assunta Ng; among the early supporters of the Asian Weekly was Gary Locke, who later became the first Asian American governor of Washington. It was distributed for free and had a circulation of 9,500 prior to the onset of the COVID-19 pandemic in 2020. The Asian Weekly ceased print publication on January 21, 2023, and became an online-only news outlet; the Seattle Chinese Post was also published on the same day.

Distribution

Northwest Asian Weekly's print version were widely distributed in Seattle, primarily at Asian American businesses, grocery stores, and restaurants. They were also available at businesses in other parts of King and Snohomish counties, as well as public libraries statewide.

References

External links

Asian-American culture in Seattle
Asian-American press
Companies based in Seattle
Newspapers published in Seattle